State Road 569 (NM 569) is a  state highway in the US state of New Mexico. NM 569's southern terminus is at the end of route at Charette Lake, and the northern terminus is at Frontage Road 2151 (FR 2151) (Former US 85) north-northeast of Colmor just east of the junction with Interstate 25 (I-25).

Major intersections

See also

References

569
Transportation in Colfax County, New Mexico
Transportation in Mora County, New Mexico